Sri Priyanka is an Indian actress who has appeared in Tamil language films. After portraying her first major lead role in Agadam (2014), she appeared in the Tamil film Kangaroo  (2015).

In April 2017, she signed to play an important role in Vikram - Tamannaah starrer Sketch     directed by Vijay Chander.

Career
Sri Priyanka made her acting debut through the low-budget village-centric film, Nila Meedhu Kadhal, for which she worked throughout 2012. Sri Priyanka then appeared in Agadam (2014), a film which entered the Guinness Record Books for being the longest uncut film, before signing on to appear in director Samy's Kangaroo (2015). Prior to accepting the offer, she revealed she had not seen any of the director's controversial earlier films.

During the making of Kodai Mazhai in June 2014, Priyanka fainted after being slapped by her fellow actor, Kalanjiyam. Her family considered filing a legal complaint against the makers of the film before opting not to pursue the matter further.

Filmography

References

Indian film actresses
Actresses in Tamil cinema
Living people
Actresses from Puducherry
21st-century Indian actresses
Actresses in Kannada cinema
1995 births